Dmytro Lytvynenko (born 16 April 1987), is a Ukrainian futsal player who plays for Lokomotiv Kharkiv and the Ukraine national futsal team.

References

External links
UEFA profile

1987 births
Living people
Futsal goalkeepers
Ukrainian men's futsal players
MFC Lokomotyv Kharkiv players
21st-century Ukrainian people